Şerife Alperi Onar (born 2 January 1996) is a Turkish basketball player for Fenerbahçe and the Turkish national team.

References

External links
 Alperi Onar at FIBA
 Alperi Onar at tbf.org

1996 births
Living people
Turkish women's basketball players
Botaş SK players
Galatasaray S.K. (women's basketball) players
Fenerbahçe women's basketball players